The wedding of Victoria, Crown Princess of Sweden, and Daniel Westling took place on  2010 in Stockholm Cathedral.  It has been described as "Europe's biggest royal wedding since the Prince of Wales married Lady Diana Spencer in 1981." Westling thereby acquired Victoria's ducal title, becoming a Swedish prince and Duke of Västergötland.
In time for the wedding, a joint monogram of their initials was created.

Background
Victoria is the eldest child of King Carl XVI Gustaf and Queen Silvia. As the firstborn of the family, she was designated heir apparent in 1979, (SFS 1979:932) ahead of her younger brother. 
Westling was Victoria's personal trainer at Master Training. In July 2002, Victoria and Westling were pictured kissing for the first time at a birthday party for Caroline Kreuger, a close friend of Victoria's. Westling and Victoria's engagement was announced on 24 February 2009. The wedding was set to take place in Stockholm Cathedral on 19 June 2010, the 34th anniversary of her parents' marriage and a traditional wedding date of the Swedish Royal Family (several past House of Bernadotte family members had married on that date). The chosen year 2010 also marks the 200th year since Jean Baptiste Jules Bernadotte, from whom the Royal House of Sweden descends, became heir presumptive to the Swedish throne.

Preparations and finances
On 17 September 2009, the cathedral parish of Stockholm announced that there would be a restoration of Stockholm Cathedral during the period January–April 2010, and costing  Swedish kronor. The wedding itself cost about  kronor which was paid half by the Swedish Royal Family and half by the Swedish government from tax money. This was criticized by some Swedish citizens but the argument was debunked by official response saying that the wedding will generate equivalent or more revenue from the event. This argument was mostly seen as an excuse to continue the monarchy system, rather than evaluating their present-day relevance.

Celebrations

On 24 November 2009 it was decided that the days between the Swedish national day on 6 June and the wedding date on 19 June would be Love Stockholm 2010 days. With festivities for residents and visitors such as music, art, culture, food, design, and history, the city of Stockholm had hoped for sponsor deals to pay for the arrangements.

On 18 June, the Parliament of Sweden honoured the couple with a gala performance at Stockholm Concert Hall. Performers at the gala included the Royal Stockholm Philharmonic Orchestra, Malena Ernman, Helen Sjöholm, and Peter Jöback. The famous Swedish band Roxette was reunited on stage, and they performed their hit song "The Look".

Insignia at the wedding
On the morning of the wedding, the Crown of Sweden's Heir Apparent and Prince Wilhelm's Crown were removed from their showcases in the Treasury at the Royal Palace of Stockholm.  They were placed on each side of the altar in the cathedral. The crowns are part of a tradition, a crown is  used in association with the person the occasion is about.  Princess Sofia Albertina's crown is also associated with Victoria as it was used at her christening.  Princess Sofia Albertina's crown  was later used at the wedding of Prince Carl Phillip.

Wedding service

The wedding service began at 15:30 local time in Stockholm Cathedral, with around 1,100 guests present. The music in the ceremony was headed by Gustaf Sjökvist, court organist and organist for the Cathedral Parish of Stockholm. He was also in charge of the music during the wedding of Victoria's parents in 1976.

The service was conducted by Anders Wejryd, Archbishop of Uppsala. He was assisted by  Lars-Göran Lönnermark, Royal Court Chief Chaplain, and Dr Antje Jackelén, Bishop of Lund. The Great Marriage Litany was sung by Åke Bonnier, Dean of the Cathedral and Royal Court Chaplain.

Victoria's white satin dress was by Swedish designer Pär Engsheden and had a five meter long train. She wore Empress Josephine's cameo diadem which her mother, Queen Silvia, and two of her paternal aunts wore when they married.

The first piece of music that was played was written by Karin Rehnqvist especially for the couple as a gift from the Royal Swedish Academy of Music.

Victoria walked down the aisle with her father, who then handed her over to Daniel. The wedding couple then stood in front of the archbishop, who told them about the importance of supporting each other in a marriage. After Victoria and Daniel were pronounced husband and wife, Swedish singers Agnes Carlsson and Björn Skifs finished the ceremony with the song "When You Tell The World You're Mine", written for the couple. Victoria and Daniel walked under crossed swords after stepping out of the cathedral.

Debate about handing over the bride
The couple wanted the king to lead the crown princess to the altar and there hand her over to the groom. This created a public debate in Sweden, as that would have been contrary to the established customs of the Church of Sweden, where bride and groom walk up to the altar together. Critics among the clergy held that the symbolism in handing over the bride from father to groom reflects reactionary societal norms, as if an unmarried woman is the property of her father and is about to turn into the proprietary ownership of the groom. The Royal Court defended the handing over with the statement that, "the king conveys the heir to the throne and hands her over to a man who has been accepted".  In the end a compromise was reached, with the king handing over the crown princess to her groom before they reached the altar.

Carriage procession

A carriage procession followed the ceremony, in which the wedding couple was transported through the streets of Stockholm. On their way they passed by twenty musical bands, nineteen of which were military. Victoria and Daniel then proceeded in the royal barge Vasaorden over Stockholm's waters; the same barge that was used by Victoria's parents, King Carl XVI Gustaf and Queen Silvia, during their wedding in 1976. 500,000 people are estimated to have gathered to watch the procession, which was nearly seven kilometers long. 18 fighter jets flew across the sky as the barge approached its landing place at the royal palace, where the wedding banquet was later held.

The wedding of Victoria and Daniel was the biggest event that has ever been covered on television in Stockholm, according to Sveriges Television.

Guest list
Notable guests include:

The Bride's paternal family

 The King and Queen, the bride's parents
 Prince Carl Philip, Duke of Värmland, the bride's brother
 Princess Madeleine, Duchess of Hälsingland and Gästrikland, the bride's sister
 Princess Margaretha, Mrs. Ambler, the bride's paternal aunt
 James and Ursula Ambler, the bride's first cousin and his wife
 Edward and Helen Ambler, the bride's first cousin and his wife
Baroness Sibylla von Dincklage the bride's first cousin
Madeleine von Dincklage, Bridesmaid, the bride's first cousin, once removed
 Princess Birgitta and Prince Johann Georg of Hohenzollern, the bride's paternal aunt and uncle
 Prince Carl Christian and Princess Nicole of Hohenzollern, the bride's first cousin and his wife
 Désirée and Eckbert von Bohlen und Halbach, the bride's first cousin and her husband
 Prince Hubertus and Princess Ute Maria of Hohenzollern, the bride's first cousin and his wife
 Princess Désirée, Baroness Silfverschiöld and Baron Niclas Silfverschiöld, the bride's paternal aunt and uncle
 Baron Carl and Baroness Maria Silfverschiöld, the bride's first cousin and his wife
 Baroness Christina Louise and Baron Hans De Geer, the bride's first cousin and her husband
 Ian De Geer, Page boy, the bride's first cousin, once removed
 Baroness Hélène Silfverschiöld, the bride's first cousin
 Princess Christina, Mrs. Magnuson and Mr Tord Magnuson, the bride's paternal aunt and uncle
 Gustaf Magnuson and Nathalie Ellis, the bride's first cousin and his partner
 Oscar Magnuson and Emma Ledent, the bride's first cousin and his partner
 Victor Magnuson and Frida Bergström, the bride's first cousin and his partner
 Marianne Bernadotte, the bride's paternal grandaunt by marriage 
 Count Michael and Countess Christine Bernadotte of Wisborg, the bride's first cousin once removed and his wife
 Countess Kajsa Bernadotte of Wisborg, the bride's second cousin
 Count Carl Johan and Countess Gunnila Bernadotte of Wisborg, the bride's paternal granduncle and grandaunt
 Countess Bettina Bernadotte of Wisborg and Philipp Haug, the bride's second cousin once removed and her husband 
 Count Björn and Countess Sandra Bernadotte of Wisborg, the bride's second cousin once removed and his wife
 Madeleine Kogevinas, the bride's second cousin twice removed
 Count Bertil Bernadotte of Wisborg and Countess Jill Bernadotte of Wisborg, the bride's second cousin twice removed, and his wife
 Dagmar von Arbin, the bride's second cousin twice removed

The Bride's maternal family
 Ralf de Toledo Sommerlath and Charlotte de Toledo Sommerlath, the bride's maternal uncle and aunt 
 Carmita Sommerlath Baudinet and Pierre Baudinet, the bride's cousin and her husband
 Thibault Radigues de Chennevière, the bride's cousin, once removed
 Chloé Radigues de Chennevière, the bride's cousin, once removed
 Thomas de Toledo Sommerlath and Ms Bettina Aussems, the bride's cousin and his partner
 Susanne de Toledo Sommerlath
 Tim de Toledo Sommerlath, the bride's cousin, once removed
 Philip de Toledo Sommerlath, the bride's cousin, once removed
 Giulia de Toledo Sommerlath, Bridesmaid, the bride's cousin, once removed
 Walther L. Sommerlath and Ingrid Sommerlath, the bride's maternal uncle and aunt
 Sophie Pihut-Sommerlath, the bride's cousin
 Patrick Sommerlath and Maline Luengo, the bride's cousin and his partner
 Leopold Lundén Sommerlath, the bride's cousin, once removed (page boy) 
 Camilla Lundén, the bride's cousin ex-wife
 Helena Christina Sommerlath, the bride's cousin
 Vivien Nadine Sommerlath, Bridesmaid, the bride's cousin
 Carlos Augusto de Toledo Ferreira and Senhora Anna Luiza de Toledo Ferreira
 Senhora Maria Virginia Braga Leardi and Exmo Senhor Eduardo Longo
 Senhor Luiz Machado de Melo and Senhora Maria Fernanda Machado de Melo
 Exma Senhora Vera Quagliato
 Senhor Carlos M. Quagliato
 Senhor Pedro Ferreira

The Groom's family
 Olle Westling and Ewa Westling, the groom's parents
 Anna Westling Blom, the groom's sister and Mikael Söderström 
Hedvig Blom, the groom's niece (bridesmaid)
Vera Blom, the groom's niece (bridesmaid)

Foreign royalty

Members reigning royal families
  The King and Queen of the Belgians
  The Duke and Duchess of Brabant
  Princess Astrid and Prince Lorenz of Belgium
  Prince Laurent and Princess Claire of Belgium
  The Queen and Prince Consort of Denmark
  The Crown Prince and Crown Princess of Denmark
  Prince Christian of Denmark (page boy)
  The Crown Prince of Japan (representing the Emperor of Japan)
  The King and Queen of Jordan
  Princess Iman of Jordan
  Prince Ali Bin Al-Hussein and Princess Rym bin Al-Hussein of Jordan
  Prince Hassan bin Talal and Princess Sarvath El Hassan
  Prince Rashid bin Al-Hassan of Jordan
  Princess Noor bin Asem of Jordan
  The Hereditary Prince and Hereditary Princess of Liechtenstein (representing the Prince of Liechtenstein)
  The Grand Duke and Grand Duchess of Luxembourg
  The Hereditary Grand Duke of Luxembourg
  Prince Félix of Luxembourg
  The Prince of Monaco and Charlene Wittstock
  The Queen of the Netherlands
  The Prince of Orange and Princess Máxima of the Netherlands
  Princess Catharina-Amalia of the Netherlands (bridesmaid)
  Prince Constantijn and Princess Laurentien of the Netherlands
  Prince Friso and Princess Mabel of Orange-Nassau
  The King and Queen of Norway
  The Crown Prince and Crown Princess of Norway
  Princess Ingrid Alexandra of Norway (bridesmaid)
  Princess Märtha Louise of Norway and Ari Behn
  The Queen of Spain (representing the King of Spain)
  The Prince and Princess of Asturias
  The Duchess of Lugo
  The Duchess and Duke of Palma de Mallorca
  The Earl and Countess of Wessex (representing the Queen of the United Kingdom and Commonwealth Realms)

Members of non-reigning royal families

 Prince Manuel and Princess Anna of Bavaria
 Tsar Simeon II and Queen Margarita of the Bulgarians
 The Prince and Princess of Preslav
 King Constantine II and Queen Anne-Marie of the Hellenes
 Princess Alexia of Greece and Denmark and Mr Carlos Morales Quintana
 Prince Nikolaos of Greece and Denmark and Miss Tatiana Blatnik
 Prince Philippos of Greece and Denmark
 Crown Princess Margareta and Prince Radu of Romania
 The Hereditary Prince and Hereditary Princess of Saxe-Coburg and Gotha
 The Prince and Princess of Sayn-Wittgenstein-Berleburg 
 The Hereditary Prince of Sayn-Wittgenstein-Berleburg and Miss Carina Axelsson
 Princess Alexandra of Sayn-Wittgenstein-Berleburg and Count Jefferson von Pfeil und Klein-Ellguth
 Princess Nathalie of Sayn-Wittgenstein-Berleburg and Mr Alexander Johannsmann
 Crown Prince Alexander and Crown Princess Katherine of Yugoslavia

Religious figures
 Bishop Anders Arborelius, Bishop of the Roman Catholic Diocese in Sweden 
 Chief Rabbi emeritus Morton H. Narrowe
 Imam Abd al Haqq Kielan, Islamic Association
 Mission Director Karin Wiborn, Chairwoman of the Christian Council of Sweden

Politicians and diplomats
 Stefan Mikaelsson (President of the Sami Parliament)

Swedish Parliament
 Per Westerberg (Speaker) and Ylwa Westerberg
 Jan Björkman (First Deputy Speaker; Soc Dem) and Rector Karmen Björkman
 Birgitta Sellén (Second Deputy Speaker; Centre), and Agriculturalist Sven-Olov Sellén
 Liselott Hagberg (Third Deputy Speaker; Lib) and Police Inspector Göran Hagberg
 Anders Forsberg (Secretary-General of the Riksdag)
 Secretariat of the Chamber, and Birgitta Forsberg
 Lars Starell (Head of Section of the Riksdag's International Office) and Christina Starell

Party leaders
 Mona Sahlin (Soc Dem Party Chairwoman) and Bo Sahlin
 Peter Eriksson (Green Spokesperson)
 Maria Wetterstrand (Green Spokesperson) and MP Ville Niinistö

Group leaders
 MP Sven-Erik Österberg (Soc Dem) Group Leader, and Teacher Ann-Marie Österberg
 MP Lars Lindblad (Mod) Group Leader, and Sales Director Maria Lindblad
 MP Roger Tiefensee (Centre) Group Leader, and Economist Catharina Tiefensee
 MP Johan Pehrson (Lib) Group Leader, and Chief Legal Officer Pernilla Wikström Pehrson
 MP Stefan Attefall (Christ Dem) Group Leader and Chairman of the Finance Committee, and Public Relations Officer Cecilia Attefall
 MP Alice Åström (Left) Group Leader, and Journalist Lars Johansson
 MP Mikaela Valtersson (Green) Group Leader, and Group Leader Lars Valtersson
 MP Ulf Holm (Green) Group Leader

Committee Chairmen and Chairwomen
 MP Hillevi Engström, (Mod), Chairwoman of the Labour Market Committee, and Mr Patrik Kronegård
 MP Carina Moberg, (Soc Dem) Chairwoman of the Civil Affairs Committee, and Director Johnny Ahlqvist
 MP Anders Karlsson, (Soc Dem) Chairman of the Defence Committee, and Mrs Inga-Lill Karlsson
 MP Thomas Bodström, (Soc Dem) Chairman of the Justice Committee, and Teacher Helén Bodström
 MP Berit Andnor, (Soc Dem) Chairwoman of the Committee on the Constitution, and Director General Bo Bylund
 MP Carl B. Hamilton, (Lib) Chairman of the Committee on Industry and Trade, and Deputy CEO Ulrika Stuart Hamilton
 MP Lennart Hedquist, (Mod) Chairman of the Taxation Committee, and Controller Elisabeth Hedquist
 MP Gunnar Axén, (Mod) Chairman of the Social Insurance Committee, and Anna Nyholm, LL.M.
 MP Kenneth Johansson, (Centre) Chairman of the Social Affairs Committee, and Mrs Viola Johansson
 MP Lena Hallengren, (Soc Dem) Chairwoman of the Transport and Communications Committee, and Political Secretary Jonas Hellberg
 MP Sofia Larsen, (Centre) Chairwoman of the Education Committee, and Mr Lars Larsen
 MP Göran Lennmarker, (Mod) Chairman of the Foreign Affairs Committee, and Mrs Gunilla Lennmarker
 MP Berit Högman, (Soc Dem) Deputy Chairwoman of the Labour Market Committee, and Mr Östen Högman
 MP Inger René, (Mod) Deputy Chairwoman of the Civil Affairs Committee
 MP Thomas Östros, (Soc Dem) Deputy Chairman of the Finance Committee, and Nurse Susanne Östros
 MP Rolf Gunnarsson, (Mod) Deputy Chairman of the Finance Committee, and MP Agnetha Gunnarsson 
 MP Inger Davidson, (Christ Dem) Deputy Chairwoman of the Justice Committee, and Music Director Hans Davidson
 MP Per Bill, (Mod) Deputy Chairman of the Committee on the Constitution, and Mrs Louise Bill
 MP Christer Nylander, (Lib) Deputy Chairman of the Cultural Affairs Committee, and Mrs Camilla Nylander
 MP Claes Västerteg, (Centre) Deputy Chairman of the Environment Committee, and Entrepreneur Malin Västerteg
 MP Tomas Eneroth, (Soc Dem) Deputy Chairman of the Committee on Industry and Trade, and Probation Officer Sofia Eneroth
 MP Lars Johansson, (Soc Dem) Deputy Chairman of the Taxation Committee, and Development Director Ingela Tuvegran
 MP Veronica Palm, (Soc Dem) Deputy Chairwoman of the Social Insurance Committee, and City Commissioner Roger Mogert
 MP Ylva Johansson, (Soc Dem) Deputy Chairwoman of the Social Affairs Committee, and Director, former minister Erik Åsbrink 
 MP Jan-Evert Rådhström, (Mod) Deputy Chairman of the Transport and Communications Committee, and Store Manager Åsa Rådhström
 MP Marie Granlund, (Soc Dem) Deputy Chairwoman of the Education Committee
 MP Anna Kinberg Batra, (Mod) Chairwoman of the Advisory Committee on EU Affairs, and Civil Economist David Batra

The Government
 Fredrik Reinfeldt, (Prime Minister; Mod), and Filippa Reinfeldt (County Council Commissioner for Healthcare)
 Maud Olofsson, (Centre; Deputy Prime Minister) and Rolf Olofsson
 Carl Bildt and Mrs Anna Maria Corazza Bildt
 Beatrice Ask (Mod; Minister for Justice)
 Mats Odell, (Christ Dem; Minister for Financial Markets) and Elisabeth Odell
 Cristina Husmark Pehrsson (Mod; Minister for Social Security) and Folke Pehrsson
 Maria Larsson, (Christ Dem; Minister for Elderly Care and Public Health, Ministry of Health and Social Affairs) and Mr Gunnar Larsson
 Eskil Erlandsson (Centre; Minister for Agriculture) and Bodil Nilsson
 Andreas Carlgren (Centre; Minister for the Environment) and Tomas Harila Carlgren
 Åsa Torstensson (Centre; Minister for Communications) and Mr Hugo Andersson
 Göran Hägglund (Christ Dem; Minister for Social Affairs) and Karin Hägglund
 Jan Björklund (Lib; Minister for Education) and Anette Brifalk Björklund (Public Relations Manager)
 Gunilla Carlsson, (Mod; Minister for International Development Cooperation) and David Weckner
 Sven Otto Littorin (Mod; Minister for Employment) and Press Secretary Évin Khaffaf
 Anders Borg, (Mod; Minister for Finance) and Susanna Borg
 Nyamko Sabuni, (Lib; Minister for Integration and Gender Equality) and Mr Carl A. Bergquist
 Tobias Billström, (Mod; Minister for Migration) and Sofia Billström
 Lena Adelsohn Liljeroth, (Mod; Minister for Culture) and Former County Governor Ulf Adelsohn
 Sten Tolgfors, (Mod; Minister for Defence) and Karin Larsson
 Ewa Björling, (Mod; Minister for Trade) and Nicke Björling
 Tobias Krantz (Lib; Minister for Higher Education and Research) and Mrs Anna Grönlund Krantz

State Secretaries
 State Secretary HG Wessberg, Prime Minister's Office, and Marianne Reimers-Wessberg
 State Secretary Gustaf Lind, Prime Minister's Office, and Charlotta Lind
 State Secretary Magnus G. Graner, Ministry for Justice, and Mrs Susanne Graner
 State Secretary Hans Lindblad, Ministry of Finance, and District Medical Officer Agnetha Lindblad

Former Speakers
 Thage G. Peterson (former Speaker) and Marion Peterson
 Birgitta Dahl (former Speaker) and Enn Kokk
 Björn von Sydow (former Speaker) and Madeleine von Sydow

Former Prime Minister
 Göran Persson (former Prime Minister) and Anitra Steen

Public Authorities
 Archbishop Anders Wejryd and Kajsa Wejryd (Chief Education Officer)
 Justice of the Supreme Administrative Court Sten Heckscher, President of the Supreme Administrative Court, and Maria Melin
 Fredrik Wersäll (President of the Svea Court of Appeal) and Anna Wersäll
 Sverker Göranson (Supreme Commander of the Swedish Armed Forces General) and Ann Göranson
 Anders Flodström (Chancellor of the Swedish Universities Professor) and Barbro Flodström
 Justice of the Supreme Court Marianne Gernandt Lundius, President of the Supreme Court, and Johan Gernandt
 Bo Bladholm (Chairman of the Stockholm City Council) and Mrs Rose-Marie Bladholm
 Sten Nordin (Mod; Finance Commissioner of the City of Stockholm) and Hanna Hesser Nordin
 Eva Brunne (Bishop of Stockholm) and Gunilla Lindén (Assistant Vicar)
 Antje Jackelén (Bishop of Lund) and Vicar Heinz Jackelén
 Åke Bonnier (Dean of the Cathedral Parish of Stockholm) and Kristina Gustafsson Bonnier 
 National Police Commissioner Bengt Svenson, National Police Board, and Mrs Elisabeth Hallqvist
 Anders Danielsson (Head of the Swedish Security Service) and Mrs Malin Gillberg
 Carin Götblad (Chief Commissioner of the Stockholm County Police) and Professor Erling Bjurström
 Anders Hallberg (Rector Magnificus Professor at Uppsala University) and Gunilla Hallberg
 Anders Lindström (Commandant-General Lieutenant General) and Katharina Söderling-Lindström
 Thomas Norell (Director General) and Mrs Lena Forssén
 Herman af Trolle (Chief of Protocol Ambassador) and Ambassador Ingrid Hjelt af Trolle

County Governors
 Per Unckel (Governor of Stockholm County) and Mistress of Ceremonies Titti Unckel
 Lars Bäckström (Governor of Västra Götaland County) and Ann-Christin Bäckström
 Barbro Holmberg (Governor of Gävleborg County)
 Peter Egardt (Governor of Uppsala County from 12 April 2010) and Lena Egardt
 Bo Könberg (Governor of Södermanland County) and Mrs Anita Könberg
 Elisabeth Nilsson (Governor of Östergötland County from 7 June 2010) and Mr Arne Andersson 
 Lars Engqvist (Governor of Jönköping County) and Mrs Gullbritt Engqvist
 Kristina Alsér (Governor of Kronoberg County) and Jan Alsér
 County Governor Sven Lindgren (Chairman of the Civil Defence League) and Anna Lindgren
 Cecilia Schelin Seidegård (Governor of Gotland County)
 Gunvor Engström (Governor of Blekinge County) and Jan Engström
 Göran Tunhammar (Governor of Skåne County) and Johanna Tunhammar, LL.M.
 Lars-Erik Lövdén (Governor of Halland County) and Christina Lövdén 
 Eva Eriksson (Governor of Värmland County) and Leif Tengroth
 Rose-Marie Frebran (Governor of Örebro County) and Hans Gunnar Frebran
 Ingemar Skogö (Governor of Västmanland County) and Ingrid Skogö, B.A.
 Maria Norrfalk (Governor of Dalarna County) and Björn Lothigius, M.For.
 Bo Källstrand, (Governor of Västernorrland County) and Eva Källstrand
 Britt Bohlin (Governor of Jämtland County)
 Chris Heister (Governor of Västerbotten County)
 Per-Ola Eriksson (Governor of Norrbotten County) and Mrs Lena Eriksson

Republican heads of state
  The President of Finland and Pentti Arajärvi
  The President of Iceland and Dorrit Moussaieff

Ambassadors to Sweden
  Ruhi Hado (Albanian Ambassador) and Mrs Blegina Hado
  Fatha Mahraz (Algerian Ambassador) and Mrs Wahiba Mahraz
  Matthew W. Barzun (American Ambassador) and Mrs Brooke Barzun
  Domingos Culolo (Angolan Ambassador) and Mrs Deolinda Pedro Culolo
  Hernán Massini Ezcurra (Argentinian Ambassador) and Mrs Silvia Fosabril
  Paul Stephens (Australian Ambassador) and Mrs Christina Stephens
  Dr Ulrike Tilly (Austrian Ambassador) and Dr Antonio Núñez y García-Saúco
  Imtiaz Ahmed (Bangladeshi Ambassador) and Mrs Daisy Ahmed
  Andrei Grinkevich (Belarusian Ambassador) and Mrs Julia Grinkevich
  Marc Baptist (Belgian Ambassador) and Mrs Myriam Baptist-Devuyst
  Milton René Soto Santiesteban (Bolivian Ambassador) and Mrs Lilian Trujillo Bustillo
  Darko Zelenika (Bosnia and Herzegovina Ambassador)
  Bernadette Sebage Rathedi (Botswana Ambassador)
  Antonino Mena Gonçalves (Brazilian Ambassador) and Mrs Elisabeth Mena Gonçalves
  Andrew J. Mitchell (British Ambassador) and Mrs Helen Mitchell
  Ivan Tzvetkov (Bulgarian Ambassador) and Mrs Ira Yaneva
  Alexandra Volkoff (Canadian Ambassador) 
  José Miguel Cruz (Chilean Ambassador) and Mrs María Angélica Toledo Arcos
  Rafael Nieto Navia (Colombian Ambassador) and Mrs Maria Teresa Loaiza de Nieto
  André Hombessa (Republic of the Congo Ambassador) and Mrs Augustine Hombessa
  Vladimir Matek (Croatian Ambassador) and Mrs Cecile Elise Matek
  Pavlos Anastasiades (Cypriot Ambassador) and Mrs Maria Anastasiades
  Tom Risdahl Jensen (Danish Ambassador) and Mrs Helle Bundgaard
  Roberto Betancourt Ruales (Ecuadorian Ambassador) and Mrs Paula Teixeira Guerra de Betancourt
  Osama Elmagdoub (Egyptian Ambassador) and Mrs Naglaa Mohamed Essameldin Elzawahry
  Martin Rivera Gómez (Salvadoran Ambassador) and Mrs Patricia Guirola de Rivera
  Alar Streimann (Estonian Ambassador) and Mrs Marika Streimann
  Dina Mufti Sid (Ethiopian Ambassador) and Mrs Lina Kassa Feleke
  Markus Lyra (Finnish Ambassador) and Mrs Iris Lyra
  Joël De Zorzi (French Ambassador) and Mrs Soraya De Zorzi
  Amiran Kavadze (Georgian Ambassador) and Mrs Ia Kavadze
  Joachim Rücker (German Ambassador) and Dr Ines Kirschner
  Fernando Molina Girón (Guatemalan Ambassador) and Mrs Victoria Eugenia Flores de Molina
  Gabór Szentiványi (Hungarian Ambassador) 
  Gudmundur Á. Stefánsson (Icelandic Ambassador) and Mrs Jóna D. Karlsdóttir
  Balkrishna Shetty (Indian Ambassador) and Mrs Vasundara Shetty
  Rasoul Eslami (Iranian Ambassador) and Mrs Fatemeh Eslami
  Donal Hamill (Irish Ambassador) and Mrs Bernadette Hamill
  Benny Dagan (Israeli Ambassador) and Mrs Irit Dagan
  Angelo Persiani (Italian Ambassador) and Mrs Lisette Ingo
  Akira Nakajima (Japanese Ambassador) and Mrs Keiko Nakajima
  Purity Muhindi (Kenyan Ambassador) and Dr Keguro Joe Muhindi
  Ali Al-Nikhailian (Kuwaiti Ambassador) and Mrs Hana'a Yaqoub Yousef Buqammaz
  Maija Manika (Latvian Ambassador) 
  Done Somvorachit (Laotian Ambassador) and Mrs Douangchay Somvorachit
  Nasrat El-Assaad (Lebanese Ambassador) and Dr Ruzica Gasovic
  Remigijus Motuzas (Lithuanian Ambassador) and Mrs Laimut Motuzien
  Agon Demjaha (Macedonian Ambassador) and Mrs Teuta Demjaha
  Kamarudin Mustafa (Malaysian Ambassador) and Datin Nik Rahua Nik Ab Rahman
  Norma Pensado Moreno (Mexican Ambassador) and Mr Patricio Montecinos
  Enkhmandakh Baldan (Mongolian Ambassador) and Mrs Oyunbileg Davaasuren
  Zohour Alaoui (Moroccan Ambassador) and Mr Karim Kamal Bernoussi
  Pedro Comissário Afonso (Mozambican Ambassador) and Mrs Mariana Dava
  Theresia Samaria (Namibian Ambassador) and Mr Johannes Samaria
  Jan Edward Craanen (Dutch Ambassador) and Mrs Annick Georgelin
  Godknows Boladei Igali (Nigerian Ambassador) and Mrs Tokoni Igali
  Ri Hui Chol (North Korean Ambassador) and Mrs Kim Jae Un
  Anne K Lund (Norwegian Ambassador) and Mr Erling Magnusson
  Nadeem Riyaz (Pakistani Ambassador) and the Ambassador Ayesha Riyaz
  Ricardo Quintero (Panamanian Ambassador) and Mrs Alejandra Alemán
  Gilbert Chauny de Porturas (Peruvian Ambassador) and Mrs Carmen de Chauny
  Maria Zeneida Collinson (Philippine Ambassador) and Mr Michael Collinson
  Michal Czy (Polish Ambassador) and Mrs Elbieta Czy
  Raduta Dana Matache (Romanian Ambassador) and Mr Constantin Matache
  Igor Neverov (Russian Ambassador) and Mrs Elena Neverova
  Jacqueline Mukangira (Rwandan Ambassador) and Mr Charles Nahayo
  Abdulrahman Gdaia (Saudi Arabian Ambassador) and Princess Lubna Z.M. Al Thunayan Al Saud
  Henri Antoine Turpin (Senegalese Ambassador) and Mrs Virginie Turpin
  Ninoslav D. Stojadinovi (Serbian Ambassador) and Mrs Andjelka Stojadinovi
  Vojislav Šuc (Slovenian Ambassador) and Mrs Dragica Šuc
  Sophonia Rapulane Makgetla (South African Ambassador) and Dr Neva Makgetla
  Cho Hee-yong (South Korean Ambassador) and Mrs Lee Yang
  Enrique Viguera (Spanish Ambassador) and Mrs Marta Altolaguirre
  Ranjith P. Jayasooriya (Sri Lankan Ambassador) and Mrs Cynthia Jayasooriya
  Moses Mojwok Akol (Sudanese Ambassador) and Mrs Suzan John Ayowk Ajang
  Kurt Höchner (Swiss Ambassador) and Mrs Gila Höchner
  Sheikha Najla Al Qassimi (United Arab Emirati Ambassador)
  Thanarat Thanaputti (Thai Ambassador)
  Zergün Korutürk (Turkish Ambassador) and H.R. Mr Selah Korutürk (Ambassador)
  Yevgen Perebyinis (Ukrainian Ambassador), Mrs Olha Perebyinis, and Mrs Ana Bernaldo De Quiros
  Manuel Vieira Merola (Uruguayan Ambassador) and Mrs Marta Dieste Friedheim
  Archbishop Emil Paul Tscherrig (Apostolic Nuncio)
  Nguyen Duc Hoa (Vietnamese Ambassador) and Mrs Tran Nguyen Anh Thu
  Anne Luzongo Mtamboh (Zambian Ambassador)
  Mary Sibusisiwe Mubi (Zimbabwean Ambassador)

Confederation of Swedish Enterprise
 President Signhild Arnegård Hansen, Confederation of Swedish Enterprise, and Director Michael Hansen
 Director Kenneth Bengtsson, ICA Handlarnas AB, and Mrs Ann-Kristin Bengtsson

Organisations
 Anna Ekström (Chairwoman of the Swedish Confederation of Professional Associations (SACO)) and Lars Ekström, M.Eng
 Chairman Sture Nordh, Confederation of Professional Employees (TCO), and HR Supervisor Gudrun Nordh
 Marcus Storch, MD (Hon), Chairman of the Nobel Foundation, and Mrs Gunilla Storch
Secretary General Karin Mattsson Weijber, Swedish Sports Confederation, and Mr Henric Weijber

Culture, media
 Theatre Director Birgitta Svendén, Theatre Director from 1 April 2010, and Director Thomas Svendén
 Lord in waiting and Concert Hall Director Stefan Forsberg, Stockholm Concert Hall, and Mrs Els-Marie Forsberg
 Director Peter Hansson, CEO of the Gothenburg Opera, and Kristina Hansson
 Director Eva Hamilton, VD, SVT, and Karl-Johan von Heland
 Head of Swedish Radio Mats Svegfors, CEO Sveriges Radio AB, and Rigmor Svegfors
 Director Jan Scherman, TV4, and Mrs Margareta Scherman
 Editor-in-Chief Jan Helin, Aftonbladet, and Lawyer Charlotte Helin
 Journalist Simon Johnson, Thomson Reuters
 Ebba von Sydow (journalist)

The Royal Academies and others
 Peter Englund (Permanent Secretary Professor at the Swedish Academy) and Josefin Englund
 Gunnar Öquist (Permanent Secretary Professor at the Royal Academy of Sciences) and Mrs Gunvor Öquist
 Professor Gunnel Engwall (President of the Royal Academy of Letters, History and Antiquities)
 Professor Sara von Arnold (President of the Royal Swedish Academy of Agriculture and Forestry)
 President Ulla Fries, the Royal Swedish Academy of Arts, and Dr Tor-Göran Henriksson
 Master of the King's Music Professor Kjell Ingebretsen, President of the Royal Academy of Music, and Music Director Elisabeth Ingebretsen
 Professor Bo Huldt (Director of the Royal Swedish Academy of War Sciences)

Patronage
 Director Lena M. Lindén, Ph.D. (Hon), Nordens Ark 
 Professor Johnny Ludvigsson, Chairman of the Child Diabetes Foundation
 Director of Development Aid Christer Åkesson, the Church of Sweden's International Development Aid (Lutherhjälpen)
 Director of the Secretariat Siw Dreber, Radiohjälpen, Victoria Fund
 Director Magnus N:son Engelbäck, Young Enterprise association
 Operational Manager Kennet Fröjd, Swedish Development Centre for Disability Sport
 National Director Annette Rihagen, Swedish Women's Voluntary Defence Organisation, and Director Thord Axelsson 
 Agnetha Mbuyamba (Secretary General for the National Association for Disabled Children and Youths)
 Baron Johan Nordenfalk (Chairman of the Friends of the Nordic Museum and Skansen) and Baroness Anna Lena Nordenfalk
 Professor Lars Olson (Chairman of Karolinska Institutet's Nobel Assembly)

Other
 Gerda Johansson
 Herman and Birgitta Lindqvist
 Dick Harrison and Katarina Lindbergh
 Tommy and Anna Möller
 Thomas Ohlson and Liana Lopez
 Antonia Axelson Johnson and Göran Ennerfelt
 Mats Jansson and Karin Orehag-Jansson
 Jacob Wallenberg and Annika Levin
 Marcus Wallenberg and Fanny Sachs
 Melker and Kerstin Schörling
 Fredrik and Anne-Marie Lundberg
 Bertil and Lisbeth Hult
 Peter Wallenberg Jr. and Katarina Ozolins
 Leif and Eva Johansson
 Cristina Stenbeck and Alex Fitzgibbons
 Dan Sten Olsson and Jane Olsson Thorburn
 Gustaf and Ulla-Britt Sjökvist
 Ulla-Britta Wahlberg
 Kerstin Johansson
 Hannelore Sjöblom
 Lars G and Katarina Malmer
 Claes and Michaela Kalborg
 Elsa and Mats Victorin
 Sophie Tolstoy Regen
 Jimmy Meurling
 Peggy and Jan Bruzelius
 Jan and Kerstin Eliasson
 Håkan Norelius
 Roderick Martin
 Malena Ernman and Svante Thunberg
 Martin and Karin Fröst
 Lisa Nilsson and Niklas Medin
 Peter Jöback and Oscar Nilsson
 Per and Åsa Gessle

Personal friends
 Mr Johan Beckman and Lady-in-waiting Mrs Eliane de Gunzburg Beckman
 Countess Beck-Friis
 State Secretary for Foreign Affairs Frank Belfrage and Interior Designer Helena Belfrage
 Registered Doctor Michaël Berglund and Caroline Berglund, B.A.
 Director Hans Eric Brodin and Mrs Eva Benita Brodin
 Baron Carl de Geer and Baroness Christina de Geer
 Ambassador Ulf Dinkelspiel and Educational Adviser Mrs Louise Dinkelspiel
 Department Head Marianne von der Esch
 Director Sven Philip Sörensen and Mrs Marie-Louise Sörensen
 Director Anders Lettström and Mrs Christina Lettström
 Commander Bertil Nordström
 Mrs Agneta Kreuger and Director Lars Abrahamson
 Director Jan Öhrvall and Photographer Gunilla Öhrvall
 Chairman Stefan Persson, H&M AB, and Mrs Denise Persson
 Mrs Annika Kahm
 Baron Gustaf Banér and Baroness Agneta Banér
 Miss Christina Banér
 Dr e.h. Achim Middelschulte and Frau Beate Middelschulte
 Mr J. Christer Elfverson
 Mrs Signe von der Esch
 Mr Gilbert E. Kaplan and Mrs Lena Kaplan

The Bride and Groom's personal friends
 Dr Constantin Beier and Dr Amelie Beier Middelschulte
 Mr Michael Broms and Anna Jussil Broms, LL.M.
 Mr Marten Bunnemann and Mrs Annika Bunnemann
 Captain Christoffer Cederlund and Mrs Charlotte Kreuger Cederlund
 Baron Jacob de Geer and Baroness Nicole de Geer
 Mr Peder Dinkelspiel and Mrs Caroline Dinkelspiel
 Mr Niclas Engsäll and Mrs Andrea Engsäll
 Mrs Josephine Génetay and Mr Anderson Zapata Diaz
 Mr Marcus Josefsson and Mrs Sophie Josefsson
 Mr Jesper Nilsson and Mrs Caroline Nilsson
 Director Karl-Johan Persson and Mrs Leonie Persson
 Mr Gustaf Wiiburg and Mrs Rebecka Wiiburg
 Mr Patrik Vrbanc and Mrs Camilla Vrbanc Vidjeskog
 Mr Lars Hellström and Mrs Johanna Hellström
 Mr Niklas Ek and Mrs Anna Ek
 Mr Andreas Nylin and Mrs Carina Nylin
 Director Alessandro Catenacci and Mrs Susanne Catenacci
 Mr Patrik Gummeson and Mrs Linda Gummeson
 Jesper Ederth, Ph.D., and Registered Doctor Helena Ederth
 Mr Oscar Hallberg and Mrs Veronica Bångfeldt
 Mr Emil Larsson and Mrs Therése Danneman
 Mr Fredrik Arnander and Mrs Jennifer Arnander
 Mr Johan Skarborg and Mrs Carolina Skarborg
 Mr Staffan Svensson and Mrs Lena Svensson
 Mr Martin Brunehult Wermelin and Mrs Marie Wermelin
 Director Erik Paulsson, PEAB, and Mrs Gunilla Paulsson
 Director Anders Lindberg, JKL Stockholm, and Civil Economist Eva Lindberg
 Mr Hans Boman and Mrs Marianne Boman
 Mr Björn Örås and Mrs Bibbi Örås
 Consul General Barbro Osher and Mr Bernard Osher
 Mr David M. D. Greenfeld and Mrs Dorothy Greenfeld
 Mr Micael Bindefeld and Mr Nicklas Sigurdsson
 Mrs Sara Matson Westover and Mr James Westover
 Dr Diane Mickley and Dr Steven Mickley
 Chairman Michael Treschow and Professor Lena Treschow Torell
 Jörgen Elofsson (composer) and Mrs Christina Elofsson
 Professor Christopher Gillberg and Carina Gillberg
 Director Lars Enochson and Mrs Elisabeth Enochson
 Miss Louise Gottlieb and Baron Gustav Thott

Wedding banquet
The wedding banquet was held on the night of the wedding day in the Hall of State at the Royal Palace of Stockholm, Sweden's finest ceremonial hall. The Hall of State was renovated for the occasion. 98 guests of the nearly 600 invited guests were accommodated in the main table. Pink and white flowers were strewn over the table decorations, which included silver candelabra and silver bowls. On the seats of honour were sitting the wedding couple; their parents King Carl Gustaf and Queen Silvia and Mr and Mrs Westling; Victoria's godparents Ralf de Toledo Sommerlath, Princess Désirée, Baroness Silfverschiöld, the Queen of the Netherlands and the King of Norway as well as Count Carl Johan Bernadotte of Wisborg, the King's uncle; Princess Margaretha, Mrs. Ambler, the King's eldest sister; the Queen of Denmark, the King of the Belgians; Tarja Halonen, the President of Finland; and Anders Wejryd, the Archbishop of Uppsala.

Cake
The cake was an 11 tiered cake made of organic ingredients. The sides of the cake were decorated with four-leaf clovers, symbolising the crown princely couple and their wedding. Each layer of the cake was topped with several chocolate wafers with the royal couple's monogram in caramel. The top layer had a large version of the crown princely couple's monogram is reproduced in cast caramel. The crown princely couple's wedding cake was a gift from the Swedish Association of Bakers and Confectioners.

Titles for Daniel Westling

Sweden has only practiced absolute cognatic primogeniture since 1980 (SFS 1979:932). This means that Victoria is the first female heir apparent to marry.  Westling became the first man of the people to obtain a new title or rank as the spouse of a Swedish princess since the Middle Ages.  All previous princes have been born to royal parents of Swedish origin or have been foreign dukes that have married Swedish princesses. As a result, questions arose as to how Westling would be known after the wedding.

The Swedish Royal Court first announced on  2010 that upon his marriage to Crown Princess Victoria, who is Duchess of Västergötland, Westling would receive the titles of "Prince Daniel" and "Duke of Västergötland". It was further announced in May 2010, by the Swedish Royal Court, that Westling will be granted the style His Royal Highness upon his marriage to Crown Princess Victoria. He will thus be known as Prince Daniel, Duke of Västergötland. The last part of his title corresponds in form to the style used by other Swedish princes, including Victoria's younger brother Prince Carl Philip, Duke of Värmland, i.e. Prince + Given name + Duke of Swedish Province. The novelty here is that Westling would be using his wife's ducal title, something new for men in Sweden.

Sweden discontinued in the 17th century the grant of provinces as territorial appanages to royal princes which, as dukes thereof, they had governed semi-autonomously. Since then, these provincial dukedoms exist in the royal family only nominally, but each prince or princess traditionally maintains a special public connection to one. The sons of Swedish kings have held the princely title as a rank of nobility (e.g. Fredrik Vilhelm, Prince (Furste) av Hessenstein), as a courtesy title for an ex-dynast (e.g. Prince (Prins) Oscar Bernadotte) and, most often, as a royal dynast (e.g. Prince Bertil of Sweden, Duke of Halland).

See also
Säpojoggen
The Swedish Royal Family's jewelry
Wedding of Princess Madeleine of Sweden and Christopher O'Neill

References

External links

Official website of the wedding
Swedish Crown Princess Victoria weds fitness trainer (video)

2010 in Sweden
Marriage, unions and partnerships in Sweden
Swedish royal weddings
2010s in Stockholm
June 2010 events in Europe
Victoria